Simona Marinova (born 2 July 1994) is a Macedonian swimmer. At the 2012 Summer Olympics, she competed in the women's 800 metre freestyle, finishing in 35th place overall in the heats, failing to qualify for the final.

References

Macedonian female swimmers
Living people
Olympic swimmers of North Macedonia
Swimmers at the 2012 Summer Olympics
Macedonian female freestyle swimmers
Swimmers at the 2010 Summer Youth Olympics
Place of birth missing (living people)
1994 births